State Unani Medical College (SUMC) is a government medical college in Allahabad, Uttar Pradesh, India. In the institution all students selected through NEET (UG) get admission into BUMS course, and intake capacity of the students is 60 students per year.

History and formation
  
State Unani Medical College, Himmatganj, Allahabad, was founded by Allama Hakim Ahmad Hussain from his home in the early -1904, on his private land and as an individual institution. On July 2, 1982, along with other Ayurvedic and Unani Medical Colleges of the state- the college was provincialised and it became a government college and is being run by the Govt. of Uttar Pradesh. Government Unani Medical College, Himmatganj Allahabad, under the terms of and vide Section 37 proviso (2) of the Uttar Pradesh State University (Amendment) Act; this college has been permanently affiliated to Chhatrapati Shahuji Maharaj University, Kanpur since the year 2013 through a letter dated 3.8.2013 with letter no. CSJMU/Affiliate./ 2868/2013

Alumni
 Hakeem Muhammad Akhtar

References

External links
 About SUMC

Universities and colleges in Allahabad
Educational institutions established in 1904
1904 establishments in India
Unani medicine organisations